Amokrane «Da Mokrane» Oualiken (6 April 1933 – 22 June 2010) was an Algerian football player and manager. He played as a right winger.

Club career
Oualiken was born in Ben Aknoun, Algiers, Algeria, on 6 April 1933.

He played for French club Nîmes Olympique where he became three-time Division 1 runner-up and reached the final of the Coupe de France.

After Algeria's independence in 1962, he played for MC Alger and USM Alger.

Oualiken died on 22 June 2010 in Ben Aknoun, Algiers, following a long illness.

International career
In 1960, Oualiken became a member of the Algerian FLN team.

Coaching career
Following his retirement from playing he started his coaching career with DNC Alger. He helped the amateur club win the 1981–82 Algerian Cup and promote to the Championnat National 1, the Algerian first tier, in 1985. He later coached the Burkina Faso national team.

Oualiken was also coach of the football section of the Algerian Gendarmerie from 1969 to 1977. In 1977, he became the Technical Director of now defunct club DNC Alger, helping the team climb from the amateur divisions up to the top flight and win the Algerian Cup in 1982.

Honours

As a player
Nîmes
 Division 1 runner-up: 1958, 1959, 1960
 Coupe de France runner-up: 1958
 Trophée des Champions runner-up: 1958

SO Montpellier
 Division 2: 1961

USM Alger
 Algerian Championnat National: 1963

As a coach
DNC Alger
 Algerian Cup: 1982
 Promotion to Championnat National 1: 1985

References

External links
 
 

1933 births
2010 deaths
Algerian footballers
Association football wingers
FLN football team players
Footballers from Algiers
Kabyle people
USM Alger players
LB Châteauroux players
Nîmes Olympique players
MC Alger players
Tours FC players
Ligue 1 players
Ligue 2 players
21st-century Algerian people